The Stockhorn (2,610 m) is a mountain of the Lepontine Alps, overlooking Binn in the canton of Valais. It lies north of the Scherbadung massif.

References

External links
Stockhorn on Hikr

Mountains of the Alps
Mountains of Valais
Lepontine Alps
Mountains of Switzerland
Two-thousanders of Switzerland